Hilary Dresser (born 12 April 1968) is a British sprint canoeist who competed in the early 1980s and 1990s. She reached the semifinals of the K-4 500 m event at the 1992 Summer Olympics in Barcelona. She retired in 1996 from competing in sprint and marathon kayaking at a national level.

References

1968 births
West German female canoeists
Canoeists at the 1992 Summer Olympics
Living people
Olympic canoeists of Great Britain
Sportspeople from Stuttgart